Brand New may refer to:

Music
 Brand New (band), an American alternative rock band

Albums
 Brand New by Xiumin, 2022
 Brand New (Ben Rector album) or the title song (see below), 2015
 Brand New (Kevin Simm album) or the title song, 2008
 Brand New (Salt-n-Pepa album) or the title song, 1997
 Brand New (Shinhwa album) or the title song, 2004
 Brand New (Gary Stewart album), 1988
Brand New, by Leon Patillo, 1987
Brand New, by the Stereo Bus, 1999

Songs
 "Brand New" (Ben Rector song), 2016
 "Brand New" (Rhymefest song), 2005
 "Brand New" (Sista song), 1994
 "Brand New", by Craig David from The Time Is Now, 2018
 "Brand New", by Gucci Mane from The Appeal: Georgia's Most Wanted, 2010
 "Brand New", by Keyshia Cole from A Different Me, 2008
 "Brand New", by Shea Couleé, 2019
 "Brand New", by Trey Songz from Ready, 2009
 "Brand New", by You Me at Six from Night People, 2017
 "Brand New", written by Irving Berlin
 "Brand New", by Drake from "So Far Gone" mixtape, 2009
 "Massara" (song) (translated to English as "Brand-new"), by Kana-Boon, 2019

Other
 Brand-new, in marketing, new products or services created and promoted under a new brand
 MTV Brand New, three television channels in Europe

See also
 
 
 New (disambiguation)
 :Category:Brand management
 :Category:Promotion and marketing communications
 Branding iron
 Firebrand (disambiguation)